Metanachis is a genus of sea snails, marine gastropod mollusks in the family Columbellidae, the dove snails.

Species
 Metanachis jaspidea (G. B. Sowerby I, 1844)
 Metanachis laingensis Sleurs, 1985
 Metanachis marquesa (Gaskoin, 1852)

References

 Thiele, J. (1924). Über die Systematik der Columbelliden. Archiv für Molluskenkunde. 56(5): 200–210, pl. 9.

Columbellidae